Judith Henry may refer to:

 Judith Henry (actress) (born 1968), French actress
 Judith Henry (artist) (born 1942), American artist